This is a list of the mammal species recorded in Ethiopia. There are 279 mammal species in Ethiopia, of which five are critically endangered, eight are endangered, twenty-seven are vulnerable, and twelve are near threatened.

The following tags are used to highlight each species' conservation status as assessed by the International Union for Conservation of Nature:

Some species were assessed using an earlier set of criteria. Species assessed using this system have the following instead of near threatened and least concern categories:

Order: Macroscelidea (elephant shrews) 

Often called sengis, the elephant shrews or jumping shrews are native to southern Africa. Their common English name derives from their elongated flexible snout and their resemblance to the true shrews.

Family: Macroscelididae (elephant-shrews)
Genus: Elephantulus
 Rufous elephant shrew, E. rufescens

Order: Tubulidentata (aardvarks) 

The order Tubulidentata consists of a single species, the aardvark. Tubulidentata are characterised by their teeth which lack a pulp cavity and form thin tubes which are continuously worn down and replaced.

Family: Orycteropodidae
Genus: Orycteropus
 Aardvark, O. afer

Order: Hyracoidea (hyraxes) 

The hyraxes are any of four species of fairly small, thickset, herbivorous mammals in the order Hyracoidea. About the size of a domestic cat they are well-furred, with rounded bodies and a stumpy tail. They are native to Africa and the Middle East.

Family: Procaviidae (hyraxes)
Genus: Heterohyrax
 Yellow-spotted rock hyrax, Heterohyrax brucei LC
Genus: Procavia
 Cape hyrax, Procavia capensis LC

Order: Proboscidea (elephants) 

The elephants comprise three living species and are the largest living land animals.
Family: Elephantidae (elephants)
Genus: Loxodonta
African bush elephant, L. africana

Order: Primates 

The order Primates contains humans and their closest relatives: lemurs, lorisoids, tarsiers, monkeys, and apes.

Suborder: Strepsirrhini
Infraorder: Lemuriformes
Superfamily: Lorisoidea
Family: Galagidae
Genus: Galago
 Somali bushbaby, Galago gallarum LR/nt
 Senegal bushbaby, Galago senegalensis LR/lc
Suborder: Haplorhini
Infraorder: Simiiformes
Parvorder: Catarrhini
Superfamily: Cercopithecoidea
Family: Cercopithecidae (Old World monkeys)
Genus: Erythrocebus
 Patas monkey, Erythrocebus patas LR/lc
Genus: Chlorocebus
 Grivet, Chlorocebus aethiops LR/lc
 Vervet monkey, Chlorocebus pygerythrus LR/lc
 Bale Mountains vervet, Chlorocebus djamdjamensis VU
Genus: Cercopithecus
 Blue monkey, Cercopithecus mitis LR/lc
 Boutourlini's Blue monkey Cercopithecus mitis boutourlinii VU
 De Brazza's monkey, Cercopithecus neglectus LR/lc
Genus: Papio
 Olive baboon, Papio anubis LR/lc
 Yellow baboon, Papio cynocephalus LR/lc
 Hamadryas baboon, Papio hamadryas LR/nt
Genus: Theropithecus
 Gelada, Theropithecus gelada LR/nt
Subfamily: Colobinae
Genus: Colobus
 Mantled guereza, Colobus guereza LR/lc

Order: Rodentia (rodents) 

Rodents make up the largest order of mammals, with over 40% of mammalian species. They have two incisors in the upper and lower jaw which grow continually and must be kept short by gnawing.

Suborder: Hystricognathi
Family: Bathyergidae
Genus: Heterocephalus
 Naked mole-rat, Heterocephalus glaber LC
Family: Hystricidae (Old World porcupines)
Genus: Hystrix
 Crested porcupine, Hystrix cristata LC
Family: Thryonomyidae (cane rats)
Genus: Thryonomys
 Lesser cane rat, Thryonomys gregorianus LC
Suborder: Sciurognathi
Family: Sciuridae (squirrels)
Subfamily: Xerinae
Tribe: Xerini
Genus: Xerus
 Striped ground squirrel, Xerus erythropus LC
 Unstriped ground squirrel, Xerus rutilus LC
Tribe: Protoxerini
Genus: Heliosciurus
 Gambian sun squirrel, Heliosciurus gambianus LC
Family: Gliridae (dormice)
Subfamily: Graphiurinae
Genus: Graphiurus
 Small-eared dormouse, Graphiurus microtis LC
Family: Spalacidae
Subfamily: Tachyoryctinae
Genus: Tachyoryctes
 Big-headed African mole-rat, Tachyoryctes macrocephalus EN
 Northeast African mole-rat, Tachyoryctes splendens LC
Family: Nesomyidae
Subfamily: Dendromurinae
Genus: Dendromus
 Lovat's climbing mouse, Dendromus lovati VU
 Gray climbing mouse, Dendromus melanotis LC
 Chestnut climbing mouse, Dendromus mystacalis LC
Genus: Megadendromus
 Nikolaus's mouse, Megadendromus nikolausi DD
Genus: Steatomys
 Tiny fat mouse, Steatomys parvus LC
Subfamily: Cricetomyinae
Genus: Saccostomus
 Mearns's pouched mouse, Saccostomus mearnsi LC
Family: Cricetidae
Subfamily: Lophiomyinae
Genus: Lophiomys
 Maned rat, Lophiomys imhausi LC
Family: Muridae (mice, rats, voles, gerbils, hamsters, etc.)
Subfamily: Deomyinae
Genus: Acomys
 Cairo spiny mouse, Acomys cahirinus LC
 Gray spiny mouse, Acomys cineraceus LC
 Louise's spiny mouse, Acomys louisae LC
 Mullah spiny mouse, Acomys mullah LC
 Wilson's spiny mouse, Acomys wilsoni LC
Genus: Lophuromys
 Short-tailed brush-furred rat, Lophuromys brevicaudus NT
 Ethiopian forest brush-furred rat, Lophuromys chrysopus NT
 Yellow-spotted brush-furred rat, Lophuromys flavopunctatus LC
 Black-clawed brush-furred rat, Lophuromys melanonyx VU
Genus: Uranomys
 Rudd's mouse, Uranomys ruddi LC
Subfamily: Otomyinae
Genus: Otomys
 Cheesman's vlei rat, Otomys cheesmani CR
 Charada vlei rat, Otomys fortior VU 
 Heller's vlei rat, Otomys helleri LC
 Simien vlei rat, Otomys simiensis LC
 Ethiopian vlei rat, Otomys typus LC
 Yalden's vlei rat, Otomys yaldeni VU
Subfamily: Gerbillinae
Genus: Ammodillus
 Ammodile, Ammodillus imbellis DD
Genus: Gerbillus
 Somalia gerbil, Gerbillus dunni DD
 Cushioned gerbil, Gerbillus pulvinatus LC
 Least gerbil, Gerbillus ruberrimus LC
Genus: Tatera
 Kemp's gerbil, Tatera kempi LC
 Black-tailed gerbil, Tatera nigricauda LC
 Phillips's gerbil, Tatera phillipsi LC
 Fringe-tailed gerbil, Tatera robusta LC
 Savanna gerbil, Tatera valida LC
Genus: Taterillus
 Emin's gerbil, Taterillus emini LC
 Harrington's gerbil, Taterillus harringtoni LC
Subfamily: Murinae
Genus: Aethomys
 Hinde's rock rat, Aethomys hindei LC
Genus: Arvicanthis
 Abyssinian grass rat, Arvicanthis abyssinicus LC
 Blick's grass rat, Arvicanthis blicki NT
 Nairobi grass rat, Arvicanthis nairobae LC
 African grass rat, Arvicanthis niloticus LC
 Neumann's grass rat, Arvicanthis neumanni DD
Genus: Dasymys
 African marsh rat, Dasymys incomtus LC
Genus: Desmomys
 Harrington's rat, Desmomys harringtoni LC
 Yalden's rat, Desmomys yaldeni EN
Genus: Grammomys
 Macmillan's thicket rat, Grammomys macmillani LC
 Ethiopian thicket rat, Grammomys minnae VU
Genus: Lemniscomys
 Buffoon striped grass mouse, Lemniscomys macculus LC
 Typical striped grass mouse, Lemniscomys striatus LC
 Heuglin's striped grass mouse, Lemniscomys zebra LC
Genus: Mastomys
 Awash multimammate mouse, Mastomys awashensis VU
 Guinea multimammate mouse, Mastomys erythroleucus LC
 Natal multimammate mouse, Mastomys natalensis LC
Genus: Muriculus
 Ethiopian striped mouse, Muriculus imberbis EN
Genus: Mus
 Mahomet mouse, Mus mahomet LC
 Peters's mouse, Mus setulosus LC
 Delicate mouse, Mus tenellus LC
Genus: Mylomys
 Ethiopian mylomys, Mylomys rex DD
Genus: Myomyscus
 Brockman's rock mouse, Myomyscus brockmani LC
Genus: Nilopegamys
 Ethiopian amphibious rat, Nilopegamys plumbeus CR
Genus: Oenomys
 Common rufous-nosed rat, Oenomys hypoxanthus LC
Genus: Stenocephalemys
 Ethiopian white-footed mouse, Stenocephalemys albipes LC
 Ethiopian narrow-headed rat, Stenocephalemys albocaudata NT
 Gray-tailed narrow-headed rat, Stenocephalemys griseicauda NT
 Rupp's mouse, Stenocephalemys ruppi DD
Genus: Thallomys
 Acacia rat, Thallomys paedulcus LC
Family: Ctenodactylidae
Genus: Pectinator
 Speke's pectinator, Pectinator spekei DD

Order: Lagomorpha (lagomorphs) 

The lagomorphs comprise two families, Leporidae with hares and rabbits, and Ochotonidae with pikas. Though they can resemble rodents, and were classified as a superfamily in that order until the early 20th century, they have since been considered a separate order. They differ from rodents in a number of physical characteristics, such as having four incisors in the upper jaw rather than two.

Family: Leporidae
Genus: Lepus
 Cape hare, Lepus capensis LC
 Ethiopian hare, Lepus fagani LC
 Abyssinian hare, Lepus habessinicus LC
 African savanna hare, Lepus microtis LC
 Ethiopian highland hare, Lepus starcki LC

Order: Erinaceomorpha (hedgehogs and gymnures) 

The order Erinaceomorpha contains a single family, Erinaceidae, which comprise the hedgehogs and gymnures. The hedgehogs are easily recognised by their spines while gymnures look more like large rats.

Family: Erinaceidae (hedgehogs)
Subfamily: Erinaceinae
Genus: Atelerix
 Four-toed hedgehog, Atelerix albiventris LR/lc
Genus: Hemiechinus
 Desert hedgehog, Hemiechinus aethiopicus LR/lc

Order: Soricomorpha (shrews, moles, and solenodons) 

The "shrew-forms" are insectivorous mammals. The shrews and solenodons closely resemble mice while the moles are stout-bodied burrowers.

Family: Soricidae (shrews)
Subfamily: Crocidurinae
Genus: Crocidura
 Bailey's shrew, Crocidura baileyi NT
 Bottego's shrew, Crocidura bottegi DD
 Bale shrew, Crocidura bottegoides EN
 African dusky shrew, Crocidura caliginea LC
 Savanna shrew, Crocidura fulvastra LC
 Bicolored musk shrew, Crocidura fuscomurina LC
 Glass's shrew, Crocidura glassi VU
 Harenna shrew, Crocidura harenna CR
 Hildegarde's shrew, Crocidura hildegardeae LC
 Lucina's shrew, Crocidura lucina VU
 Mauritanian shrew, Crocidura lusitania LC
 MacMillan's shrew, Crocidura macmillani VU
 Somali dwarf shrew, Crocidura nana DD
 African black shrew, Crocidura nigrofusca LC
 Niobe's shrew, Crocidura niobe LC
 African giant shrew, Crocidura olivieri LC
 Small-footed shrew, Crocidura parvipes LC
 Sahelian tiny shrew, Crocidura pasha LC
 Guramba shrew, Crocidura phaeura VU
 Flat-headed shrew, Crocidura planiceps DD
 Desert musk shrew, Crocidura smithii LC
 Somali shrew, Crocidura somalica LC
 Thalia's shrew, Crocidura thalia LC
 Savanna path shrew, Crocidura viaria LC
 Voi shrew, Crocidura voi LC
 Yankari shrew, Crocidura yankariensis LC
 Zaphir's shrew, Crocidura zaphiri DD
Genus: Suncus
 Etruscan shrew, Suncus etruscus LC
Genus: Sylvisorex
 Climbing shrew, Sylvisorex megalura LC

Order: Chiroptera (bats) 

The bats' most distinguishing feature is that their forelimbs are developed as wings, making them the only mammals capable of flight. Bat species account for about 20% of all mammals.
Family: Pteropodidae (flying foxes, Old World fruit bats)
Subfamily: Pteropodinae
Genus: Eidolon
 Straw-coloured fruit bat, Eidolon helvum LC
Genus: Epomophorus
 Gambian epauletted fruit bat, Epomophorus gambianus LC
 Ethiopian epauletted fruit bat, Epomophorus labiatus LC
 East African epauletted fruit bat, Epomophorus minimus LC
Genus: Hypsignathus
 Hammer-headed bat, Hypsignathus monstrosus LC
Genus: Lissonycteris
 Lissonycteris angolensis LC
Genus: Micropteropus
 Peters's dwarf epauletted fruit bat, Micropteropus pusillus LC
Genus: Rousettus
 Egyptian fruit bat, Rousettus aegyptiacus LC
 Long-haired rousette, Rousettus lanosus LC
Family: Vespertilionidae
Subfamily: Kerivoulinae
Genus: Kerivoula
 Ethiopian woolly bat, Kerivoula eriophora DD
 Lesser woolly bat, Kerivoula lanosa LC
Subfamily: Myotinae
Genus: Myotis
 Rufous mouse-eared bat, Myotis bocagii LC
 Morris's bat, Myotis morrisi VU
 Scott's mouse-eared bat, Myotis scotti VU
 Cape hairy bat, Myotis tricolor LC
 Welwitsch's bat, Myotis welwitschii LC
Subfamily: Vespertilioninae
Genus: Glauconycteris
 Butterfly bat, Glauconycteris variegata LC
Genus: Laephotis
 De Winton's long-eared bat, Laephotis wintoni LC
Genus: Mimetillus
 Moloney's mimic bat, Mimetillus moloneyi LC
Genus: Neoromicia
 Cape serotine, Neoromicia capensis LC
 Tiny serotine, Neoromicia guineensis LC
 Banana pipistrelle, Neoromicia nanus LC
 Somali serotine, Neoromicia somalicus LC
 White-winged serotine, Neoromicia tenuipinnis LC
 Zulu serotine, Neoromicia zuluensis LC
Genus: Nycticeinops
 Schlieffen's bat, Nycticeinops schlieffeni LC
Genus: Pipistrellus
 Mount Gargues pipistrelle, Pipistrellus aero VU
 Rüppell's pipistrelle, Pipistrellus rueppelli LC
 Rusty pipistrelle, Pipistrellus rusticus LC
Genus: Plecotus
 Ethiopian big-eared bat, Plecotus balensis VU
Genus: Scotoecus
 Dark-winged lesser house bat, Scotoecus hirundo DD
Genus: Scotophilus
 African yellow bat, Scotophilus dinganii LC
 Greenish yellow bat, Scotophilus viridis LC
Subfamily: Miniopterinae
Genus: Miniopterus
 Greater long-fingered bat, Miniopterus inflatus LC
 Natal long-fingered bat, Miniopterus natalensis NT
 Common bent-wing bat, Miniopterus schreibersii LC
Family: Rhinopomatidae
Genus: Rhinopoma
 Egyptian mouse-tailed bat, R. cystops 
 Lesser mouse-tailed bat, Rhinopoma hardwickei LC
 Macinnes's mouse-tailed bat, Rhinopoma macinnesi VU
 Greater mouse-tailed bat, Rhinopoma microphyllum LC
 Small mouse-tailed bat, Rhinopoma muscatellum LR/lc
Family: Molossidae
Genus: Chaerephon
 Ansorge's free-tailed bat, Chaerephon ansorgei LC
 Gland-tailed free-tailed bat, Chaerephon bemmeleni LC
 Spotted free-tailed bat, Chaerephon bivittata LC
 Chapin's free-tailed bat, Chaerephon chapini DD
 Nigerian free-tailed bat, Chaerephon nigeriae LC
 Little free-tailed bat, Chaerephon pumila LC
Genus: Mops
 Angolan free-tailed bat, Mops condylurus LC
 Midas free-tailed bat, Mops midas LC
 Dwarf free-tailed bat, Mops nanulus LC
Genus: Mormopterus
 Natal free-tailed bat, Mormopterus acetabulosus VU
Genus: Otomops
 Large-eared free-tailed bat, Otomops martiensseni NT
Genus: Platymops
 Peters's flat-headed bat, Platymops setiger DD
Genus: Tadarida
 Egyptian free-tailed bat, Tadarida aegyptiaca LC
 African giant free-tailed bat, Tadarida ventralis NT
Family: Emballonuridae
Genus: Coleura
 African sheath-tailed bat, Coleura afra LC
Genus: Taphozous
 Mauritian tomb bat, Taphozous mauritianus LC
 Egyptian tomb bat, Taphozous perforatus LC
Family: Nycteridae
Genus: Nycteris
 Andersen's slit-faced bat, Nycteris aurita DD
 Hairy slit-faced bat, Nycteris hispida LC
 Large-eared slit-faced bat, Nycteris macrotis LC
 Parissi's slit-faced bat, Nycteris parisii DD
 Egyptian slit-faced bat, Nycteris thebaica LC
Family: Megadermatidae
Genus: Cardioderma
 Heart-nosed bat, Cardioderma cor LC
Genus: Lavia
 Yellow-winged bat, Lavia frons LC
Family: Rhinolophidae
Subfamily: Rhinolophinae
Genus: Rhinolophus
Blasius's horseshoe bat, R. blasii 
 Geoffroy's horseshoe bat, Rhinolophus clivosus LC
 Eloquent horseshoe bat, Rhinolophus eloquens DD
 Rüppell's horseshoe bat, Rhinolophus fumigatus LC
 Hildebrandt's horseshoe bat, Rhinolophus hildebrandti LC
 Lesser horseshoe bat, Rhinolophus hipposideros LC
 Lander's horseshoe bat, Rhinolophus landeri LC
 Bushveld horseshoe bat, Rhinolophus simulator LC
Subfamily: Hipposiderinae
Genus: Asellia
 Patrizi's trident leaf-nosed bat, Asellia patrizii VU
 Trident leaf-nosed bat, Asellia tridens LC
Genus: Hipposideros
 Sundevall's roundleaf bat, Hipposideros caffer LC
 Commerson's roundleaf bat, Hipposideros marungensis NT
 Ethiopian large-eared roundleaf bat, Hipposideros megalotis NT
 Noack's roundleaf bat, Hipposideros ruber LC
Genus: Triaenops
 Persian trident bat, Triaenops persicus LC

Order: Pholidota (pangolins) 

The order Pholidota comprises eight pangolin species, which feed on ants and have powerful claws, an elongated snout and a long tongue.

Family: Manidae
Genus: Manis
 Ground pangolin, Manis temminckii VU

Order: Carnivora (carnivorans) 

There are over 260 species of carnivorans, the majority of which feed primarily on meat. They have a characteristic skull shape and dentition.

Suborder: Feliformia
Family: Felidae (cats)
Subfamily: Felinae
Genus: Acinonyx
Cheetah, Acinonyx jubatus VU
 Northeast African cheetah, Acinonyx jubatus soemmeringii EN
Genus: Caracal
Caracal, Caracal caracal LC
Genus: Felis
African wildcat, F. lybica 
Genus: Leptailurus
Serval, Leptailurus serval LC
Subfamily: Pantherinae
Genus: Panthera
Lion, Panthera leo VU
Northern Lion, Panthera leo leo EN
Southern Lion, Panthera leo melanochaita EN
Leopard, Panthera pardus VU
African Leopard, Panthera pardus pardus VU
Family: Viverridae
Subfamily: Viverrinae
Genus: Civettictis
African civet, Civettictis civetta LC
Genus: Genetta
Abyssinian genet, Genetta abyssinica DD
Common genet, Genetta genetta LC
Rusty-spotted genet, Genetta maculata LC
Family: Herpestidae (mongooses)
Genus: Atilax
 Marsh mongoose, Atilax paludinosus LC
Genus: Helogale
 Ethiopian dwarf mongoose, Helogale hirtula LC
 Common dwarf mongoose, Helogale parvula LC
Genus: Herpestes
 Egyptian mongoose, Herpestes ichneumon LC
Common slender mongoose, Herpestes sanguineus LC
Somalian slender mongoose, Herpestes ochracea LC
Genus: Mungos
 Banded mongoose, Mungos mungo LC
Genus: Ichneumia
 White-tailed mongoose, Ichneumia albicauda LC
Family: Hyaenidae (hyaenas)
Genus: Crocuta
 Spotted hyena, Crocuta crocuta LC
Genus: Hyaena
 Striped hyena, Hyaena hyaena NT
Genus: Proteles
 Aardwolf, Proteles cristatus LC
Suborder: Caniformia
Family: Canidae (dogs, foxes)
Genus: Vulpes
 Pale fox, Vulpes pallida LC
 Rüppell's fox, Vulpes rueppelli LC
Genus: Canis
 African golden wolf, Canis lupaster LC
 Ethiopian wolf, Canis simensis EN
Genus: Lupulella
 Side-striped jackal, L. adusta 
 Black-backed jackal, L. mesomelas 
Genus: Otocyon
 Bat-eared fox, Otocyon megalotis LC
Genus: Lycaon
 African wild dog, Lycaon pictus EN
Family: Mustelidae (mustelids)
Genus: Ictonyx
 Striped polecat, Ictonyx striatus LC
Genus: Mellivora
Honey badger, M. capensis 
 Ethiopian honey badger, M. capensis abyssinica
Genus: Hydrictis
 Spotted-necked otter, H. maculicollis LC
Genus: Aonyx
 African clawless otter, A. capensis LC

Order: Perissodactyla (odd-toed ungulates) 

The odd-toed ungulates are browsing and grazing mammals. They are usually large to very large and have relatively simple stomachs and a large middle toe.

Family: Equidae (horses etc.)
Genus: Equus
 African wild ass, E. africanus CR
Somali wild ass, E. a. somaliensis CR
 Grevy's zebra, E. grevyi EN
 Plains zebra, E. quagga NT
Grant's zebra, E. q. boehmi 
Family: Rhinocerotidae
Genus: Diceros
 Black rhinoceros, D. bicornis CR
Eastern black rhinoceros, D. b. michaeli CR/locally extinct

Order: Artiodactyla (even-toed ungulates) 

The even-toed ungulates are ungulates whose weight is borne about equally by the third and fourth toes, rather than mostly or entirely by the third as in perissodactyls. There are about 220 artiodactyl species, including many that are of great economic importance to humans.

Family: Suidae (pigs)
Subfamily: Phacochoerinae
Genus: Phacochoerus
 Desert warthog, Phacochoerus aethiopicus
 Common warthog, Phacochoerus africanus
Subfamily: Suinae
Genus: Hylochoerus
 Giant forest hog, Hylochoerus meinertzhageni
Genus: Potamochoerus
 Bushpig, Potamochoerus larvatus
Family: Hippopotamidae (hippopotamuses)
Genus: Hippopotamus
 Hippopotamus, Hippopotamus amphibius VU
Family: Giraffidae (giraffe, okapi)
Genus: Giraffa
 Giraffe, Giraffa camelopardalis VU
 Nubian giraffe, Giraffa camelopardalis camelopardalis CR
 Reticulated giraffe, Giraffa camelopardalis reticulata EN
Family: Bovidae (cattle, antelope, sheep, goats)
Subfamily: Alcelaphinae
Genus: Alcelaphus
 Hartebeest, Alcelaphus buselaphus
 Lelwel hartebeest, Alcelaphus buselaphus lelwel EN
 Swayne's hartebeest, Alcelaphus buselaphus swaynei EN
 Tora hartebeest, Alcelaphus buselaphus tora CR
Genus: Damaliscus
 Topi, Damaliscus lunatus VU
 Tiang, Damaliscus lunatus tiang LC
Subfamily: Antilopinae
Genus: Ammodorcas
 Dibatag, Ammodorcas clarkei VU
Genus: Dorcatragus
 Beira, Dorcatragus megalotis VU
Genus: Gazella
 Dorcas gazelle, Gazella dorcas VU
 Grant's gazelle, Gazella granti
 Red-fronted gazelle, Gazella rufifrons VU
 Soemmerring's gazelle, Gazella soemmerringii VU
 Speke's gazelle, Gazella spekei VU possibly extirpated
 Thomson's gazelle, Gazella thomsonii
Genus: Litocranius
 Gerenuk, Litocranius walleri
Genus: Madoqua
 Günther's dik-dik, Madoqua guentheri
 Salt's dik-dik, Madoqua saltiana
Genus: Oreotragus
 Klipspringer, Oreotragus oreotragus
Genus: Ourebia
 Oribi, Ourebia ourebi
Subfamily: Bovinae
Genus: Syncerus
 African buffalo, Syncerus caffer
Genus: Tragelaphus
 Mountain nyala, Tragelaphus buxtoni EN
 Lesser kudu, Tragelaphus imberbis
 Common eland, Tragelaphus oryx
 Bushbuck, Tragelaphus scriptus
 Menelik's bushbuck, Tragelaphus scriptus meneliki EN
 Greater kudu, Tragelaphus strepsiceros
Subfamily: Caprinae
Genus: Capra
 Nubian ibex, Capra nubiana VU
 Walia ibex, Capra walie VU
Subfamily: Cephalophinae
Genus: Cephalophus
 Harvey's duiker, Cephalophus harveyi
 Blue duiker, Cephalophus monticola
Genus: Sylvicapra
 Common duiker, Sylvicapra grimmia
Subfamily: Hippotraginae
Genus: Hippotragus
 Roan antelope, Hippotragus equinus
Genus: Oryx
 East African oryx, Oryx beisa
Subfamily: Reduncinae
Genus: Kobus
 Waterbuck, Kobus ellipsiprymnus
 Kob, Kobus kob
 Nile lechwe, Kobus megaceros
Genus: Redunca
 Mountain reedbuck, Redunca fulvorufula LC
 Bohor reedbuck, Redunca redunca

See also
List of chordate orders
Lists of mammals by region
List of prehistoric mammals
Mammal classification
List of mammals described in the 2000s

Notes

References
 

 
Mammals
Ethiopia
Ethiopia